Marcus George Hines (20 November 1919 – 26 July 1985) was an Australian rules footballer who played with St Kilda in the Victorian Football League (VFL).

Notes

External links 

1919 births
1985 deaths
Australian rules footballers from Victoria (Australia)
St Kilda Football Club players
People from Beechworth